Ettingshausen is an inhabited place in Middle Hesse, Germany. It is part of the municipality (Gemeinde) of Reiskirchen, in the district (Landkreis) of Giessen. It has around 1900 inhabitants.

Giessen (district)